Baber may refer to:

 Baber (surname), an English surname
 Baber, Iran (disambiguation), various places in Iran
 Baber, West Virginia, an unincorporated community in Logan County, West Virginia, in the United States
 Baber (Moghul), a variant spelling of Babur, Moghul emperor of northern India

See also
 Babers